Massachusetts House of Representatives' 12th Essex district in the United States is one of 160 legislative districts included in the lower house of the Massachusetts General Court. It covers part of the city of Peabody in Essex County. Democrat Tom Walsh of Peabody has represented the district since 2017.

The current district geographic boundary overlaps with that of the Massachusetts Senate's 2nd Essex district.

Representatives
 John Lovejoy, circa 1858-1859 
 William Davis Sohier, circa 1888 
 Mial W. Chase, circa 1920 
 Charles Symonds, circa 1920 
 Walter A. Cuffe, circa 1951 
 Joseph Francis Walsh, circa 1951 
 Robert C. Buell, circa 1975 
 Theodore C. Speliotis
 John P. Slattery
 Joyce Spiliotis
 Leah Cole
 Thomas P. Walsh, 2017-current

Former locale
The district previously covered South Danvers, circa 1872.

See also
 List of Massachusetts House of Representatives elections
 Other Essex County districts of the Massachusetts House of Representatives: 1st, 2nd, 3rd, 4th, 5th, 6th, 7th, 8th, 9th, 10th, 11th, 13th, 14th, 15th, 16th, 17th, 18th
 Essex County districts of the Massachusett Senate: 1st, 2nd, 3rd; 1st Essex and Middlesex; 2nd Essex and Middlesex
 List of Massachusetts General Courts
 List of former districts of the Massachusetts House of Representatives

Images

References

External links
 Ballotpedia
  (State House district information based on U.S. Census Bureau's American Community Survey).

House
Government of Essex County, Massachusetts